Major-general Sir William Henry Sleeman KCB (8 August 1788 – 10 February 1856) was a British soldier and administrator in British India. He is best known for his work from the 1830s in suppressing the organized criminal gangs known as Thuggee. He also discovered the holotype specimen of the sauropod dinosaur Titanosaurus indicus in Jabalpur in 1828.

Early life and career
Sleeman was born in Stratton, Cornwall, the fifth of eight children of Philip Sleeman, a yeoman and supervisor of excise of St Tudy.

In 1809 Sleeman joined the Bengal Army and later served in the Nepal War between 1814 and 1816. He contracted malaria in 1813, symptoms of which occasionally reappeared for the remainder of his life (with sometimes debilitating intensity).

In 1820 he was selected for civil employ, and became junior assistant to the Governor-General's agent in the Saugor and Nerbudda territories. In 1822 he was placed in charge of Narsinghpur District, and would later describe his two years in the role as by far the most laborious of his life. He was gazetted to the rank of captain in 1825, and in 1828 assumed charge of Jubbulpore District. In 1831 he transferred to Sagar district to cover for a colleague on leave.  Upon his colleague's return, Sleeman continued with magisterial duties in Sagar until 1835. He displayed a facility for languages, becoming fluent in Hindi-Urdu and developing a working knowledge of many other languages of the subcontinent. Later in his life, Sleeman was described as "probably the only British officer to address the King of Oudh in correct Urdu and Persian." His 800-page report on Oudh is still highly regarded as among the most accurate and comprehensive studies of the kingdom during the 1800s.

Sleeman made the first recorded discovery of dinosaur fossils in India in 1828. While serving as a captain in the Narmada valley region, he noticed several basaltic formations which he identified as having been "raised above the waters."  By digging around in the Bara Simla Hills, part of the Lameta formation near Jabalpur, he unearthed several petrified trees, as well as some fragmentary dinosaur fossil specimens. Subsequently, he sent these specimens to London and to the Indian Museum in Calcutta. In 1877 the genus was named Titanosaurus Indicus by Richard Lydekker, but the taxonomic position is in doubt. Sleeman wrote about wild children who had been raised by wolves with his notes on six cases. This was first published in the first volume of his Journey through the kingdom of Oude in 1848-1850 (1858) and reprinted in 1852 as An Account of Wolves Nurturing Children in Their Dens, by an Indian Official and in The Zoologist (1888 12(135):87-98). This discovery inspired Rudyard Kipling's Mowgli character in The Jungle Book.

Thuggee suppression
Sleeman is best known for his work suppressing the Thuggee secret society. Dating back as early as the 1300s, Thugs were a secret criminal group, partly hereditary in membership, who specialized in the murder by strangulation of travelers as a prelude to theft. Thugs had been known to native rulers and occasionally to Europeans, but the scope of their crimes was not appreciated (later estimated at least in the tens of thousands of victims across India). In 1835, Sleeman captured "Feringhea" (one of the inspirations for the character Syeed Amir Ali in Confessions of a Thug is based) and got him to turn King's evidence. He took Sleeman to a grave with a hundred bodies, told the circumstances of the killings, and named the Thugs who had done it. After initial investigations confirmed what Feringhea had said, Sleeman started an extensive campaign, being appointed General Superintendent of the operations for the Suppression of Thuggee and in February 1839, he assumed charge of the office of Commissioner for the Suppression of Thuggee and Dacoity. During these operations, more than 1400 Thugs were hanged or transported for life. One of them, Bahram, confessed to having strangled 125-931 persons with his turban. Detection was only possible by means of informers, for whose protection from the vengeance of their associates a special prison was established at Jabalpur (at the time Jubbulpore). Sleeman had a Government Report made in 1839.
Sleeman wrote three books about the Thugs:  Ramaseeana, or a Vocabulary of the peculiar language used by Thugs; Report on the Depredations Committed by the Thug Gangs of Upper and Central India; and The Thugs or Phansigars of India.

Colonial Construction (Fabrication) of Thuggee to Legitimize British Judicial Power in India 
In recent decades, historians have begun to revisit the British administration’s campaign against thuggee, with many arguing that thuggee was an orientalist construction formed with the intention of legitimizing increased British judicial power in India. Upon India’s independence in 1947, there were 128 tribes, constituting 3,500,000 individuals, officially classified as criminal tribes.  Established in Regulation XXVII of 1871, the Criminal Tribes Act (CTA) sought to identify, surveil, and ‘rehabilitate’ groups of Indians who, due to their itinerancy, presented a challenge to British authority. As such, tribes deemed ‘criminal’ typically included travelling craftsmen, traders, entertainers, and displaced peasants, and measures to combat their itinerancy included forced settlement, roll calls, and travel passes.

Thuggee Act of 1836, which set a legal precedent because it allowed individuals to be convicted based solely on affiliation to a criminal group, with no evidence of having committed a crime.

British Resident and later life

Sleeman served as Resident at Gwalior from 1843 to 1849, and at Lucknow from 1849 to 1856. Whilst Resident at Lucknow he survived three assassination attempts.  He was also opposed to the annexation of Oudh by Lord Dalhousie, but his advice was disregarded. Sleeman believed that British authorities should annex only regions of India that were plagued by violence, unjust leadership or poor infrastructure and thus maintained that native leadership should be left in place when their rule was even-handed.

Sleeman also took an interest in phrenology and believed that the measurements of the skulls could help him identify criminal ethnic groups.

He died and was buried at sea near Ceylon on a recovery trip to Britain in 1856, just six days after being awarded the Order of the Bath.

The village Sleemanabad in Madhya Pradesh, India was named in his honour.

Family
Whilst in Jubbulpore, he married Amélie Josephine, the daughter of Count Blondin de Fontenne, a French nobleman. They had seven children. His second daughter, Henrietta, was married to William Alexander Ross, an uncle of Sir Ronald Ross. A grandson of Sleeman, Colonel Sir James Lewis Sleeman, who also wrote about thuggee and shikar (big game hunting), became a pioneer of wildlife photography in India.

In popular culture

 The 1959 Hammer film production "The Stranglers of Bombay" recounts a story based on Sleeman suppressing criminal gangs although his part is not mentioned until the finale of the film.

 Sleeman is featured as a supporting character in the book Terror in the Sun by Barbara Cartland (1979), a romantic novel in which Thuggees are the overarching antagonists.

 Sleeman is featured in the novel The Strangler Vine by Miranda Carter (2015), Firingi Thuggee (2015) by Himadri Kishore Dasgupta and Ebong Inquisition (2020) by Avik Sarkar.

 Sleeman features in the novel  The Tigress of Mysore (2022) by Allan Mallinson. 

 Sleeman is the main antagonist in the 2016 video game Assassin's Creed Chronicles: India. In the game, Sleeman is depicted as the leader of a group of Knights Templar seeking to acquire the Koh-i-Noor diamond.
 Sleemanabad is a village named after him in Katni district in Madhya Prades.

References

This entry incorporates public domain text originally from the 1911 Encyclopædia Britannica.

Further reading

External links
 
 
 Sleeman, H. (1844) Rambles and Recollections of an Indian Official (1844; 2nd edition, 1893) full text
 Sleeman, H. (1858) A Journey through Oude full text

1788 births
1856 deaths
British East India Company Army officers
Administrators in British India
Knights Commander of the Order of the British Empire
Knights Commander of the Order of the Bath
People from Stratton, Cornwall
People from St Tudy
British military personnel of the Anglo-Nepalese War